Martin Myšička (born 9 March 1970) is a Czech actor. He has appeared in more than twenty films since 1996.

Selected filmography

External links

 

1970 births
Living people
Czech male film actors
Czech male television actors
People from Příbram
Academy of Performing Arts in Prague alumni
Charles University alumni
Czech male stage actors
20th-century Czech male actors
21st-century Czech male actors